Jayamahal was one of the 224 constituencies in the Karnataka Legislative Assembly of Karnataka a south state of India. It was a part of Bangalore North Lok Sabha constituency. It was replaced by the Hebbal Assembly constituency in a 2008 delimitation.

Member of Legislative Assembly

Mysore State
 1951-1978: Seat did not exist

Karnataka State
 1978: Jeevaraj Alva, Janata Party
 1983: Jeevaraj Alva, Janata Party
 1985: Jeevaraj Alva, Janata Party
 1989: S. M. Yahya, Indian National Congress
 1994: R. Krishnappa, Janata Dal
 1999: R. Roshan Baig, Independent
 2004: R. Roshan Baig, Indian National Congress
 2008 onwards: Seat does not exist

See also
 Bangalore Urban district
 List of constituencies of Karnataka Legislative Assembly

References

Former assembly constituencies of Karnataka
Bangalore Urban district